Tixtla de Guerrero  is one of the 81 municipalities of Guerrero, in south-western Mexico. The municipal seat lies at Tixtla de Guerrero.

As of 2005, the municipality had a total population of 37,300.

Geography

Towns and villages
In 2005, the INEGI registered 37 localities in the municipality of Tixtla de Guerrero, these are the largest:

Administration

Municipal presidents

References

Municipalities of Guerrero